Kensey Johns (1759–1848) was a lawyer, politician, jurist and plantation owner from Delaware.

Early life and family
Johns was born at Sudley Plantation in Anne Arundel County, Maryland. In his early years, he participated as a minuteman in the American Revolution and studied law with Samuel Chase and George Read.

In 1784, Johns married Ann Van Dyke, the daughter of Nicholas Van Dyke, the Governor of Delaware. George Washington was a guest at the wedding, and the home in which they were wed is preserved as a museum house in New Castle. Their children included Ann Johns (1787–1874), Susannah Johns Stewart (1789–1862), Kensey Johns Jr. (1791-1857), Rt.Rev. John Johns (1796-1876) and Rev. Henry Van Dyke Johns (1803–1859).

Career

He was admitted to the Delaware bar and practiced law for over a decade before being appointed an associate judge of the Delaware Court of Appeals (which later became the Delaware Supreme Court. In 1792, he was a member of the Delaware Constitutional Convention.

Senate appointment and rejection
On September 18, 1793, Read resigned his seat in the United States Senate. The Delaware General Assembly deadlocked on the appointment of a replacement. Finally, with the state legislature still in session but still deadlocked, Governor Joshua Clayton appointed Johns to fill the seat on March 19, 1794. He presented his credentials to Congress on March 24, 1794. Less than a month before, the Republicans in the Senate had seen one of their favorites, Albert Gallatin, unseated as failing to meet the minimum nine years citizenship constitutionally required of a U.S. senator, and they took the opportunity for revenge. Johns's credentials were immediately questioned and referred to committee. The United States Constitution permitted a state governor to fill a vacancy, but only when the state legislature was in recess. Since this was not the case, the committee reported back two days later that Johns was not qualified to take a seat in the Senate, and two days after that, the full Senate agreed and denied Johns a seat.

Later judicial career
When Read died in 1798, Johns succeeded him as chief justice of Delaware. He held that office until 1828 or 1830, when he became chancellor of Delaware. He held that post until the 1832 Constitution of Delaware became operative, at which point he was succeeded by his son, Kensey Johns Jr.

Death and legacy
Johns died in New Castle, Delaware in 1848, and his son Kensey Johns Jr. would also die before the American Civil War, and be buried in the family plot at Immanuel Episcopal Church on the Green in New Castle, Delaware. His son John Johns, the elder of the two sons who became Episcopal priests (whereas Kensey Jr. was a Presbyterian), would become a bishop in Virginia and supporter of the Confederate States of America. The Johns family lost their slaves after the war ended, but Delaware did not secede from the Union. Their ancestral home, Sudley, was listed on the National Register of Historic Places in 1973.

Almanac

See also

Sudley

References 
 

1759 births
1848 deaths
People from Anne Arundel County, Maryland
Chief Justices of Delaware
Chancellors of Delaware
Delaware lawyers
People from New Castle, Delaware
People of colonial Maryland
19th-century American lawyers